Jang Kyung-Jin (born 31 August 1983) is a South Korean football defender who last played for Hong Kong First Division League side Kitchee. His previous clubs were Ulsan Hyundai Mipo, Chunnam Dragons, Gwangju Sangmu Phoenix, Incheon United, Gwangju FC and Oita Trinita in Japan.

Club statistics

External links

 

1983 births
Living people
Association football defenders
South Korean footballers
Jeonnam Dragons players
Incheon United FC players
Gimcheon Sangmu FC players
Oita Trinita players
Gwangju FC players
Ulsan Hyundai Mipo Dockyard FC players
K League 1 players
Korea National League players
J2 League players
Sportspeople from South Jeolla Province
Hong Kong First Division League players
Hong Kong Premier League players
Kitchee SC players
Expatriate footballers in Hong Kong